The S.F. Martin House is a historic building located in Atlantic, Iowa, United States. Martin settled in Atlantic in 1865, and opened the first hardware store in town. He was also involved in several industrial efforts in town. He acquired this property between 1870 and 1872, and the house was completed in 1874. The eclectic Victorian-style house features elements of the Second Empire, Italianate, and Gothic Revival styles. It was listed on the National Register of Historic Places in 1984.

References

Houses completed in 1874
Houses on the National Register of Historic Places in Iowa
National Register of Historic Places in Cass County, Iowa
Houses in Cass County, Iowa
Atlantic, Iowa
Second Empire architecture in Iowa
Italianate architecture in Iowa